Seo Chae-hyun (Hangul: , born 1 November 2003), also known as Chaehyun Seo, is a South Korean professional climber. She won the 2019 Lead World Cup overall title in her senior debut season.

Biography 
Seo was born into a family of climbers. She started climbing in 2008. Her father owns a climbing gym in Seoul.

In 2018, at age fourteen, Seo sent a 9a route Bad Girls Club at the Wicked Cave at Rifle, Colorado.

In 2019, she made her IFSC Climbing World Cup debut and won the Lead World Cup season title ahead of Slovenian Janja Garnbret and Japanese Natsuki Tanii by winning 4 gold, 1 silver, and 1 bronze medals in six out of six lead events.
Then she participated in the Asian Championships and placed first in both lead and bouldering disciplines.

In 2019 she qualified for the first appearance of Sport Climbing at the Summer Olympics. She was due to compete at the IFSC Asian Continental Championships which were cancelled. Her placing at the IFSC Combined World Championships led to her being given the place alongside teammate Jongwon Chon.

On November 22, 2022, Seo sent La Rambla, becoming the second woman to send the route.

Rankings

World Cup

World Championships

Asian Championships

World Cup podiums

Lead

Television

References

External links 

Female climbers
2003 births
Living people
South Korean rock climbers
Sport climbers at the 2020 Summer Olympics
Olympic sport climbers of South Korea
IFSC Climbing World Championships medalists
IFSC Climbing World Cup overall medalists